Luzia Pereira de Sousa Inglês Van-Dúnem (born 11 January 1948) is an Angolan politician, feminist and expert in military telecommunications. She is a member of the Angolan National Assembly, as a member of the Popular Movement for the Liberation of Angola (MPLA).

Biography 
Van-Dúnem was born in Luanda, Angola, on 11 January 1948 and is the daughter of the Methodist minister, Guilherme Inglês. In 1961 Inglês was assassinated by colonial forces in the aftermath of the March 15 uprising. Her mother died shortly afterwards and she and her sisters joined the Movimento Popular de Libertação de Angola (MPLA; People’s Liberation Movement of Angola). From 1964 to 1967 she was in Kinshasa and Brazzaville with the MPLA; in Brazzaville, she undertook military training. In 1968 she travelled to the former Soviet Union for telecommunications training. In 1973, she became head of the Communications Station in Cassamba. During Angola's War of Independence, Van-Dúnem was a radio broadcaster in the 2nd and 3rd military political regions. From 1976 to 1991 she was in charge of the Commander-in-Chief of the Angola Armed Forces' communications centre. 

Van-Dúnem married Afonso Van-Dúnem M'binda, a former Angolan ambassador to the United Nations (UN) and they had four children. Whilst M'binda was appointed ambassador in 1991, Van-Dúnem also worked for the UN and coordinated the African Women's Group. In 1999, Van-Dúnem was elected Secretary-General of the Organização Mulher Angolana (OMA), which is the women's branch of political party, the People's Movement for the Liberation of Angola (MPLA), and was re-elected in 2005. In 2008 she was elected to the Angolan parliament, in the first elections since 1992. A champion of women's rights, she was a key proponent of the introduction of a law which meant that at least 30% of the proposed individuals on a political party's lists have to be women. This has increased the representation of women in parliament and at the 2008 election, women made up 36% of elected members. 

In 2014, she became the first Angolan woman to be promoted to the post of General Officer of the Angolan Armed Forces; the promotion was decreed by President José Eduardo dos Santos. In the 2017 general elections, Van-Dúnem was elected deputy from Angola by the National Electoral Circle. In 2020 she was elected Regional Secretary of the Pan-African Women's Organization (OPM).

References

External links 

 Homenageada nacionalista Luzia Inglês Van-Dúnem
Independência: Memórias da nacionalista Luzia Inglês

1948 births
Living people
Angolan politicians
Angolan women activists
People from Luanda
MPLA politicians